Walter Luis de Sousa (16 December 1920 – 23 August 1989) was an Indian field hockey player.

Early life
Walter was born in Mbale in East Africa where his father worked for the British government. He returned to India as a young boy to pursue his education, which he did in Saint Josephs in Bangalore
It was while he was a schoolboy in Bangalore that he started playing hockey. In the early 1940s he played for a club called the Bangalore Blues. He then moved to Bombay and joined the Times Of India and played both hockey and soccer for them.
He subsequently joined the Lusitanians - a Goan hockey team that in years to come fielded several Olympians including fellow Olympians Leo Pinto, Maxi Vaz, Reggie Rodrigues and Amir Kumar.

International and club career
A member of the Indian Field Hockey Team that took the gold medal at the 1948 Olympic competition, Walter D’Souza's athletic career lasted around two decades. In 1943 he joined the Lusitanian Hockey Team and helped them take the Provincial Cup, the Lewis Cup, the Willie Fernandes Trophy and second place in the competition for the field hockey Aga Khan Trophy. That same year, he also joined the Young Goans Football club and won his first of three successive Nadkarni Cups with the team. He captained the Lusitanians in 1944 and 1945, winning the Aga Khan Trophy and achieving second place for the Lewis Cup. In 1952, he began playing soccer for Bombay and in 1954 and 1955 he captained the city's field hockey team. As captain of the Indian Cultural League, he won the Indian Football Association's Shield, the first time a team outside of Calcutta had won the honor. He left the Lusitanians in 1956 to play for Burma Shell and continued to play for various teams on and off through 1968.

Later years and death
In 1976 he was the selector of the Indian National Hockey Team that won its first (and, as of 2006, only) Hockey World Cup. His health and eyesight began to fail and he died in 1989. His funeral was attended by many prominent field hockey players, including Lawrie Fernandes and Leo Pinto.

Representing India

1947 - East Africa Tour

1948 - London Olympics

1949 - Jashan Celebration in Afghanistan

Awards and honors
The Bakshi Bahaddar Jiva Kerkar State Award For Excellence In Sports By The Government Of Goa.

The city of Mumbai honored him by founding the Walter de Sousa Garden near the Metro Cinema in 1993.

References

External links
 
 Walter de Sousa's pages on his family website
 Profiles of eminent Goans, past and present

1920 births
1989 deaths
Goan Catholics
Field hockey players from Goa
Indian Roman Catholics
Olympic field hockey players of India
Field hockey players at the 1948 Summer Olympics
Indian male field hockey players
Olympic gold medalists for India
Olympic medalists in field hockey
Medalists at the 1948 Summer Olympics
Expatriates in Uganda
People from Eastern Region, Uganda
Ugandan people of Indian descent
Ugandan people of Goan descent